Brachylaena is a genus of flowering plants in the aster family, Asteraceae. Several are endemic to Madagascar, and the others are distributed in mainland Africa, especially the southern regions.

These are trees and shrubs with alternately arranged leaves. One of these, Brachylaena merana, is the tallest of all composites ('daisy trees") at up to 132 feet (forty meters). They are dioecious, with male and female flowers occurring on separate individuals. The flower heads are somewhat disc-shaped. Heads with female flowers are larger and produce larger pappi.

B. huillensis is the only widespread species, growing as a dominant tree in Brachylaena woodlands and a common species in some eastern African forests. It provides critical habitat for many animal species. It is also sought after for its wood and has been overexploited.

 Species

Some species are subject of dispute:
 Brachylaena rotundata S.Moore is seen by some as Brachylaena discolor var. rotundata (S.Moore) Beentje
 Brachylaena transvaalensis Hutch. ex E.Phillips & Schweick.  is seen as synonym of  Brachylaena discolor var. transvaalensis (E.Phillips & Schweick.) Beentje

References

 
Asteraceae genera
Flora of Africa
Taxonomy articles created by Polbot
Dioecious plants